Francois-Joseph-Marie dit Marius Clary (October 3, 1786 in Marseille - January 27, 1841 in Paris) was a French officer who was promoted to the rank of General de Brigade during the Hundred Days in 1815. He was the nephew of Julie Clary and Désirée Clary.

Notes

References

1786 births
1841 deaths